Gujarat state is one of the most prosperous state in Western India and having a good transportation infrastructure with an extensive road network. The Road & Buildings Department (RBD) of Gujarat government is primarily responsible for construction and maintenance of road Huis including state highways and panchayat roads in Gujarat. This department is operating through 6 wings geographical spread across the state in 26 districts. There are 17 national highways with total length of 4032 km and more than 300 state highways with total length of 19,761 km.

The state highways are arterial routes of a state, linking district headquarters and important towns within the state and connecting them with national highways or highways of the neighboring states.

Type of road and its length

List of state highways

References

Government of Gujarat

State Highways
 
Gujarat State Highways
State Highways